The Lifeguard is a 1980 Soviet drama film directed by Sergey Solovyev.

Plot 
The film takes place in a provincial city, where the filming of a documentary about the school takes place. A talented literature teacher Larikov works at this school, and his student’s attitude to the world was built on the basis of his lessons, but gradually she began to become disappointed in him.

Cast 
 Tatyana Drubich as Asya Vedeneyeva
 Vasily Mishchenko as Vilya
 Sergey Shakurov as Larikov
 Olga Belyavskaya as Olya
 Vyacheslav Kononenko as Ganin
 Alexander Kaidanovsky as Varaksin (voice by Anatoli Romashin)
 Sergey Khlebnikov as Badeykin  
 Vasili Lyovushkin as Pasha  
 Galina Petrova as Lika  
 Yekaterina Vasilyeva as Klara

References

External links 
 

1980 films
1980s Russian-language films
Soviet drama films
1980 drama films
Films directed by Sergei Solovyov
Mosfilm films
Soviet romantic drama films
1980 romantic drama films